The Flowserve Corporation is an American multinational corporation and one of the largest suppliers of industrial and environmental machinery such as pumps, valves, end face mechanical seals, automation, and services to the power, oil, gas, chemical and other industries. Headquartered in Irving, Texas, a suburb of Dallas, Flowserve has over 18,000 employees in more than 55 countries. Flowserve sells products and offers aftermarket services to engineering and construction firms, original equipment manufacturers, distributors and end users. The Flowserve brand name originated in 1997 with a merger of BW/IP and Durco International.

On August 21, 2007, Flowserve Corporation was recognized by CIO magazine as one of the 2007 CIO 100 Award Honorees.

History
Flowserve heritage dates back to the 1790 founding of Simpson & Thompson by Thomas Simpson, later to become Worthington Simpson Pumps, one of the companies that became part of BW/IP. The company was created in 1997 with the merger of two fluid motion and control companies: BW/IP and Durco International.

Acquisitions include HydroTechnik Olomouc in 2006, Sealing Systems in 2007, Calder AG in 2009 and Valbart Srl in 2010. In October 2011 Flowserve acquired Lawrence Pumps Inc. In March 2013 acquired a manufacturing plant from L&T Valves situated in Maraimalainagar, Tamil Nadu. In 2015 Flowserve acquired SIHI.

Products
Flowserve comprises over 48 fluid motion and control products.  They are in alphabetical order:

ACEC Centrifugal, Accord, Aldrich, Anchor Darling, Argus, Atomac, Automax, BW Seals, Byron Jackson, Cameron, Calder, DuraClear, Durametallic, Durco, Edward, Five Star Seals, Flowserve, Gestra, IDP, Interseal, Jeumont-Schneider, Kammer, Limitorque, Logix, McCANNA/MARPAC, NAF, NAVAL, Noble Alloy, Norbro, Nordstrom, PMV, Pac-Seal, Pacific, Pacific Wietz, Pleuger, Polyvalve, Schmidt Armaturen, Scienco, Serck Audco, Sier-Bath Rotary, TKL, United Centrifugal, Valtek, Valtek EMA, Vogt, Western Land Roller, Wilson-Snyder, Worcester Controls, Worthington

Acquisitions
Flowserve has grown through mergers and acquisitions.

Acquisitions under Flowserve Corporation 

 1997 - Merger of BW/IP and Durco International (adoption of brand name Flowserve)
 1997 - Stork Engineered Pumps
 2000 - Ingersoll-Dresser Pumps (IDP)
 2000 - Innovative Valve Technologies Inc. (Houston-based maintenance, repair, and replacement services for industrial valves, piping systems, and process system components)
 2002 - Flow Control division of Invensys (manufacturer of valves, actuators and associated flow control products)
 2004 - Thompsons Kelly & Lewis (Australian supplier of centrifugal pumps)
 2005 - Interseal assets (from Australia-based Ludowici Mineral Processing Equipment Pty Ltd.)
 2006 - HydroTechnik (privately held mechanical seal manufacturer based in Olomouc, Czech Republic)
 2007 - MF Sealing Systems (British industrial pump and seal repairer)
 2009 - Calder AG (Swiss desalination energy-recovery system provider)
 2010 - Valbart Srl (privately owned Italian valve manufacturer)
 2011 - Lawrence Pumps Inc. (privately held centrifugal pumps manufacturer)
 2013 - Audco India Limited (MMN PLANT)
 2013 - Innomag Sealless Pumps
 2015 - Sihi Group

Industries served
Oil and gas: production, refining, pipeline, gas processing
Power generation: nuclear power, combine cycle, conventional boiler, renewable water energy
Chemical processing: acid transfer, caustic and chlor-alkali, pharmaceuticals, polymers, slurry processing, solvents, volatile organic compounds, waste processing, auxiliary
Water resources: water supply and distribution, water treatment, desalination, flood control, ground water development and irrigation, wastewater collection and treatment, snowmaking
General industry: mining, primary metals, pulp and paper

Corporate governance
In July 2005, Flowserve announced a change of senior leadership. The board of directors appointed Lewis M. Kling, then Chief Operating Officer, as the new president, CEO, and member of the board of directors. On May 30, 2007 Kling's employment agreement was extended until February 28, 2010, when he retired.

Mark Blinn succeeded Kling as CEO, having previously served as Chief Financial Officer from 2004 until October 1, 2009, when he officially took over as CEO and vice chairman of the board.

Blinn subsequently also retired and was succeeded by R. Scott Rowe as President and Chief Executive Officer in April 2017.

As of April 2018, the board of directors comprises:

 Ruby R. Chandy
 Leif E. Darner
 Gayla J. Delly
 Roger L. Fix (Chairman)
 John R. Friedery
 Joseph E. Harlan
 Rick J. Mills
 David E. Roberts
 Sanjay Chowbey
 R. Scott Rowe (President and CEO)

Educational services
Flowserve has five training centers, catering for students from around the world, in Irving, Texas; Kalamazoo, Michigan; Houston, Texas, Baton Rouge, Louisiana; and Desio, Italy. The learning resource center in Irving occupies  with classrooms, static labs, and power labs with complete pumping systems. The LRC in Italy is the most recent, opening on April 20, 2010.

Environmental efforts
To support the Hurricane Katrina disaster relief, Flowserve donated $50,000 and matched up to $50,000 in employee donations to the Red Cross.

Restatements
On Feb 3, 2004, Flowserve announced restatement of its financial statements for aggregate estimated pretax adjustments for 2003. The restatement was approximately $11 million.

On Oct 26, 2004, Flowserve determined to restate its previously announced financial results for the second quarter of 2004, including certain post-closing adjustments and recently identified out-of-period expenses. The restatement had no impact on net cash balance.

On Feb 7, 2005, Flowserve confirmed that it would restate its 2000 through first quarter 2004 financial statements, resulting from an ongoing comprehensive review of the company's accounts. The restatement reduced net income for the periods restated.

See also 

 List of oilfield service companies

References

External links
Official site

Companies listed on the New York Stock Exchange
Companies based in Irving, Texas
Companies established in 1997
Manufacturing companies of the United States
Pump manufacturers